MMIA may refer to:

 Murtala Muhammed International Airport, an international airport in Ikeja, Lagos State, Nigeria
 MMIA, the ICAO code for Colima Airport, Colima, Mexico